Orthogonioptilum is a genus of moths in the family Saturniidae first described by Ferdinand Karsch in 1893.

Species

References

Saturniinae